Sainte-Alvère is a former commune in the Dordogne department in southwestern France. On 1 January 2016, it was merged into the new commune Sainte-Alvère-Saint-Laurent Les Bâtons, which merged into the new commune Val de Louyre et Caudeau on 1 January 2017.

Population

See also
Communes of the Dordogne department

References

Former communes of Dordogne